Sucker River 156C is an Indian reserve of the Lac La Ronge Indian Band in Saskatchewan. It is 230 kilometres north of Prince Albert. In the 2016 Canadian Census, it recorded a population of 416 living in 109 of its 124 total private dwellings. In the same year, its Community Well-Being index was calculated at 49 of 100, compared to 58.4 for the average First Nations community and 77.5 for the average non-Indigenous community.

References

Indian reserves in Saskatchewan
Division No. 18, Saskatchewan